(born July 29, 1954), better known as , is a Japanese actress. She won the award for best actress at the 1st Hochi Film Award for Banka, Saraba natsuno hikariyo and Brother and Sister.

Filmography

Films
 Tabi no omosa (1972) - Kayo
 Juroku-sai no senso (War of the 16 Year Olds) (1973) - Azusa/Mizue (Plays two parts)
 Aka chōchin (1974) - Yukie Shimokawa
 Imouto (1974) - Neri Kojima
 Aoba shigereru (1974) - Hiroko Wakayama
 Virgin Blues (1974) - Shoplifter
 Honō no shōzō (1974)
 Shōwa karesusuki (1975) - Noriko, the sister
 Banka (1976) - Reiko Ando
 Saraba natsuno hikariyo (Farewell, O Summer's Light) (1976) - Kyoko Toda
 Fumō chitai (1976)
 Permanent Blue: Manatsu no koi (1976) - Woman
 Brother and Sister (1976) - Mon
 Totsuzen arashi no youni (1977) - Yuki Kobayashi
 Mount Hakkoda (1977) - Sawa Takiguchi (Guide)
 Sugata Sanshiro (1977) - Otomi Murai
 Wani to oum to ottosei (1977) - Nanako
 Toward the Terra (1980) - Physis
 Something Like It (1981) - Elizabeth
 Bōkensha kamikaze (The Kamikaze Adventurers) (1981) - Kei Kaneshiro
 Farewell to the Land (1982) - Junko
 The Shootout (1982) - Tomoko Araki
 To Trap a Kidnapper (1982) - Hisako Mitamura, the victim's Mother
 Weekend Shuffle (1982) - Yoko Madaraneko
 Seiha (Conquest) (1982) - Fuyuko Tadokoro
 Aitsu to lullaby (1983) - English Teacher
 Chihei-sen (The Horizon) (1984) - Sakura, the first daughter
 Hitohira no yuki (Flakes of Snow) (1985) - Kasumi
 Yogisha (1987) - Satoko Okazaki
 Otoko wa Tsurai yo: Tora-san Plays Daddy (1987) - Takako Takai
 The Discarnates (1988) - Fusako Harada, Mother
 Yuwakusha (The Enchantment) (1989) - Miyako Shinohara
 Gurenbana (1993) - Sakura Okii
 Ressun (Lesson) (1994) - Kaya Saeki
 Deep River (1995) - Mitsuko
 Shibito no koiwazurai (Lovesick Dead) (2001) - Kazuko
 Tsuki no sabaku (Desert Moon) (2001) - Keechie's client
 The Blue Light (2003) - Yuuko Kushimori
 Toukou no ki (Translucent Tree) (2004) - Chigiri Yamazaki

Television
 Dokuganryu Masamune (1987) - Neko Gozen
 Koiwa itsumo almond pink (1988) (mini-series)
 Yodogawa Nagaharu monogatari - Kobe-hen: Sainara (1999) - Ryu, Nagaharu's mother
 Densha otoko (Train_Man) (2005) (mini-series) - Yuki Aoyama, Saori's mother
 Yae no Sakura (2013)

Japanese dub
 Feud (2017) - Bette Davis (Susan Sarandon)

References

External links
Official Site (in Japanese)

JMDb Profile (in Japanese)

Japanese actresses
1954 births
Living people
Actors from Shizuoka Prefecture